Mud Bay is the name of the northeast side of Boundary Bay on the Canada–United States border, and an unincorporated place on the bay. The area is served by the coast-spanning Island Highway and the Island Rail Corridor.

References

 

Bays of British Columbia
Designated places in British Columbia
Landforms of Lower Mainland
Delta, British Columbia
Surrey, British Columbia
White Rock, British Columbia